François Favé (18 December 1905 – 17 March 1951) was a French racing cyclist. He rode in the 1928 Tour de France.

References

1905 births
1951 deaths
French male cyclists
Place of birth missing